The Tormes is a Spanish river, that starts in Prado Tormejón, in the mountain range of Gredos, Navarredonda de Gredos, province of Ávila. It crosses the provinces of Avila and Salamanca, ending at the Duero river, at a place known locally as Ambasaguas, after .
Also it has the dam of Villagonzalo and the Almendra Dam, near to where it joins the Duero.
Length: 284 km 
Of great volume half: 42,43 ms³/s 
Surface of the river basin: 
Country that it crosses: Spain 
Mouth: Duero River at Fermoselle

Localities by which it passes 
From north to south: 
 Salamanca
 Santa Marta de Tormes
 Alba de Tormes
 Guijuelo
 Puente del Congosto
 Navamorales 
 El Losar
 El Barco de Ávila
 The Alder grove of Tormes 
 Narrowness of Tormes 
 Holes of the Hawthorn 
 Navacepeda de Tormes

Tributaries
 Zurguén stream 
 Corneja 
 Almar 
 Aravalle 
 Becedillas 
 Caballeruelo 
 Alhándiga
 Valdeascas

See also 
 List of rivers of Spain
 Roman bridge of Salamanca

References

External links

Rivers of Spain
Tormes
Geography of the Province of Ávila
Geography of the Province of Salamanca
Tributaries of the Douro River